The 2009 North African Futsal Cup was the 2nd Championship and it took place in Tunis, Tunisia from August 10–20, 2009, Organised by the Union of North African Football Federations. Syria were invited after the withdrawal of Algeria and Morocco.

Group stage

Matches

Honors

See also
Futsal Planet

2009
2009 in futsal
2009
2009–10 in Tunisian football
2009–10 in Libyan football
2009–10 in Egyptian football
2009–10 in Syrian football